The 2014 CONCACAF Women's U-20 Championship was the seventh edition of the CONCACAF Women's U-20 Championship. The United States went into the tournament as defending champions and successfully retained their title.

The tournament was hosted by the Cayman Islands from 9 to 19 January 2014.

The top three teams qualified for the 2014 FIFA U-20 Women's World Cup in Canada.  Canada has already qualified for the World Cup as the host and did not participate in this tournament.

The tournament was won by the United States, who defeated Mexico in the final, 4–0. Costa Rica secured the final qualification position by defeating Trinidad and Tobago in the third place match, 7–3 in Added Extra Time.

Qualified teams

Bold indicates that the corresponding team was hosting the event.

Group stage
The draw was announced on 5 November 2013.

All times are local (UTC-05:00).

Tie-breaking criteria
Teams were ranked on the following criteria:
 Greater number of points obtained in all group matches.
 Goal difference in all group matches.
 Greater number of goals scored in all group matches.
 Greater number of points obtained in group matches between the teams concerned.
 Drawing of lots.

Group A

Group B

Knockout stage
In the knockout stage, if a match is level at the end of normal playing time, extra time is played (two periods of 15 minutes each) and followed, if necessary, by penalty shoot-out to determine the winner.

The winners of the two semifinals and the third place match qualify for the 2014 FIFA U-20 Women's World Cup in Canada.

Semi-finals

Third-place match

Final

Winners

Goalscorers
6 goals
 McKenzie Meehan
 Tanya Samarzich

5 goals
 Savannah Jordan

4 goals

 Lindsey Horan
 Anique Walker
 Paloma Zermeño

3 goals

 Stephanie Amack
 Yesmi Talavera
 Nicole Araya
 Mallory Weber
 Jazmín Aguas

2 goals

 Khadidra Debesette
 Cynthia Pineda
 Andi Sullivan
 Linda Fonseca
 Margaret Purce
 Michelle Venegas
 Amanda Perez
 Daniela Solís
 Jazmin Villalobos

1 goal

 Mariana Arguedas
 Briana Campos
 Summer Green
 Fabiola Ibarra
 Brianna Rice
 Jessica Valadez
 Katheryn Arias
 Shanisa Camejo
 Krista Hernández
 Oshay Nelson-Lawes
 Johana Rivera
 Brittany Basinger
 Seidy Cruz
 Rachel Hill
 Daphne Monge
 Aisha Solorzano

Own goals
 Jetena Bodden (playing against Trinidad and Tobago)
 Estefanía Fuentes (playing against United States)

Awards

References

External links
Under 20s – Women, CONCACAF.com

 
2014
Women's U-20 Championship
Women's U-20 Championship
2014 in women's association football
International association football competitions hosted by Cayman Islands
2014 in youth association football